The 2017 Rugby Challenge – known as the SuperSport Rugby Challenge for sponsorship reasons – is the first edition of the Rugby Challenge, the secondary domestic rugby union competition in South Africa, and the long-term successor of the Vodacom Cup competition. The competition was organised by the South African Rugby Union and was played between 22 April and 16 July 2017.

The competition was won by Western Province, after they beat Griquas 28–19 in the final in Cape Town. Golden Lions XV fly-half Shaun Reynolds was the top scorer in the competition with 138 points, while Griquas wing Enver Brandt and Pumas hooker Frank Herne were the joint top try scorer with 9 tries. Danie Debeer was the man of the match.

Competition rules and information

The fifteen teams in the competition were divided into three regional pools of five teams. Each team will play home and away matches against the other four teams in their pool over a ten-week period. The top two teams from each pool, along with the two third-placed teams with the best record will progress to the play-offs, which will consist of quarter finals, a semi-final and a final.

Teams

The teams that will compete in the 2017 Rugby Challenge are:

Northern Section

Log

 The  and the  qualified for the quarterfinals as section winners and runners-up respectively. The  also qualified as a best third-placed team.

Round-by-round

The table below shows each team's progression throughout the season. For each round, each team's cumulative points total is shown with the overall log position in brackets.

Matches

Round One

Round Two

Round Three

Round Four

Round Five

Round Six

Round Seven

Round Eight

Round Nine

Round Ten

Central Section

Log

  and the  qualified for the quarterfinals as section winners and runners-up respectively. The  also qualified as a best third-placed team.

Round-by-round

The table below shows each team's progression throughout the season. For each round, each team's cumulative points total is shown with the overall log position in brackets.

Matches

Round One

Round Two

Round Three

Round Four

Round Five

Round Six

Round Seven

Round Eight

Round Nine

Round Ten

Southern Section

Log

  and the  qualified for the quarterfinals as section winners and runners-up respectively.

Round-by-round

The table below shows each team's progression throughout the season. For each round, each team's cumulative points total is shown with the overall log position in brackets.

Matches

Round One

Round Two

Round Three

Round Four

Round Five

Round Six

Round Seven

Round Eight

Round Nine

Round Ten

Title play-offs

The final pool standings and title play-offs seeding were:

Quarterfinals

Semifinals

Final

Honours

The honour roll for the 2017 Rugby Challenge was as follows:

Players

Squads

The following squads were named for the 2018 Rugby Challenge:

Top scorers

The top ten try and point scorers during the 2017 Rugby Challenge were:

Referees

The following referees officiated matches in the 2017 Rugby Challenge:

See also

 2017 Currie Cup Premier Division
 2017 Currie Cup First Division

References

External links
 SARU website

Rugby Challenge (South Africa)
Rugby Challenge
Rugby Challenge